Black Peruvians or Afro-Peruvians are Peruvian of mostly or partially African descent. They mostly descend from enslaved Africans brought to Peru after the arrival of the conquistadors.

Early history
The first Africans arrived with the conquerors in 1521, mostly as slaves, and some returned with colonists to settle in 1525. Between 1529 and 1537, when Francisco Pizarro was granted permits to import 363 slaves to colonial Peru, a large group of Africans were imported to do labor for public construction, building bridges and road systems. They also fought alongside the conquistadors as soldiers and worked as personal servants and bodyguards. In 1533, Afro-Peruvian slaves accompanied Spaniards in the conquest of Cuzco.

Two types of black slaves were forced to travel to Peru. Those born in Africa were commonly referred to as negros bozales ("untamed blacks"), which was also used in a derogatory sense. These slaves could have been directly shipped from west or southwest Africa or transported from the Spanish Indies or other Spanish colonies. Afro-Peruvians previously acculturated to Spanish culture and who spoke Spanish were called negros ladinos ("hispanicized blacks"). Some were mulattos, descendants of Spanish men and African women. People of color performed skilled and unskilled functions that contributed to Hispanic colonization.

In urban areas Afro-Peruvians were cooks, laundresses, maids, handymen, and gardeners. In some cases, they worked in the navy, hospitals, churches and charitable institutions. In 1587, 377 people of African descent worked in the shipyards. The industry included a significant number of blacks working in quarries, kilns and construction projects. There were not enough Spanish workers to build the colony, so blacks essentially kept the economy running. Gradually, Afro-Peruvians were concentrated in specialized fields that drew upon their extensive knowledge and training in skilled artisan work and in agriculture.

In the social hierarchy of the slave stratum, the black artisans had the highest rank due to their skills. They worked as carpenters, tailors, blacksmiths, swordsmiths and silversmiths. This group enjoyed more freedom than their fellows who worked at large haciendas or in private households. Spanish small-business keepers would dispatch a whole team of servant-artisans to do a job independently and then return to their owner. As the prices for artisans rose, black artisans gained better treatment and sometimes took a role of a low-ranking employee. Skilled trades were a major avenue of social progress for the colored population. Due to their high skills, Afro-Peruvians gained prestige among Spanish noblemen. They occupied a relatively low social stratum but had some status related to the natives, and were considered above the emerging class of mestizos (descendants of indigenous people and Spanish colonists).

As the mestizo population grew, the role of Afro-Peruvians as intermediaries between the indigenous residents and the Spaniards lessened. The mestizo population increased through liaisons between Spanish and indigenous Peruvians. The elite Spanish developed a caste system based on racial descent and color, to protect their privileges and their Spanish and mestizo children. In this system, Spaniards were at the top, mestizos in the middle, and Africans and the indigenous populations at the bottom. Mestizos inherited the privilege of helping the Spanish administer the country.

As additional immigrants arrived from Spain and settled Peru, the mestizos tried to keep the most lucrative jobs for themselves. In the early colonial period, Afro-Spaniards and Afro-Peruvians frequently worked in the gold mines because of their familiarity with the techniques. Gold mining and smithing were common in parts of western Africa from at least the fourth century. But, after the early colonial period, few Afro-Peruvians would become goldsmiths or silversmiths.

In the end Afro-Peruvians were relegated to heavy labor on sugarcane and rice plantations of the northern coast, or the vineyards and cotton fields of the southern coast. In the countryside they were represented in wet-nursing, housekeeping, domestics, cowboys, animal herding, etc. After Indians became scarce as labor force on haciendas, the people of color gained a title of yanakuna, hitherto assigned only to indigenous servants with full right to own a piece of land and a day to work on it. Afro-Peruvians often exercised agency by using huido (translated as escape, flight) from haciendas and changing masters on their own initiative or joining the cimarrones (armed gangs of runaway slaves that formed small communities in the wilderness and raided travel merchants). The indigenous population were used to work in the silver mines, where they had more expert knowledge than West Africans or Spanish, even in the pre-Columbian eras.

Slave Trade

Over the course of the slave trade, approximately 95,000 slaves were brought into Peru, with the last group arriving in 1850. Often slaves were initially transported to Cuba and Hispaniola, from where traders brought them to Panama and the Viceroyalty of Peru. Planters and others also purchased slaves in Cartagena, Colombia or Veracruz, Mexico, at trade fairs, and they returned to Peru with the new slaves imported by the slave ships. As a result of the "New laws" of 1548 and the influence of the denunciation of the abuses against Native Americans by Friar Bartolomé de las Casas, slaves gradually replaced natives at the encomiendas.

Slave owners in Peru developed preferences to have slaves from specific areas of Africa (believed to have certain characteristics); they wanted to have slaves of one area who could communicate with each other. They believed slaves from Guinea, from the Senegal River down to the Slave Coast, were easier to manage and had marketable skills. They already knew how to plant and cultivate rice, train horses, and herd cattle on horseback. The slave owners also preferred slaves from the area stretching from Nigeria to eastern Ghana. The slave owners' third choice was for slaves from Congo, Mozambique, Madagascar, and Angola.

In the 17th century some owners began the process of manumission of people of color. In some cases, slaves were allowed to buy their freedom, and a free Afro-Peruvian social class emerged. Slaves had to pay a high amount to buy their freedom; some were allowed to earn money on the side or, if leased out, keep a portion of their earnings. Others raised loans, and some were granted freedom by their master. Even when free, independent blacks were not considered equal to Spaniards. Free people of color enjoyed equal privileges in certain aspects, for instance, there are records of free Africans buying and selling land as well. Freed blacks engaged in various entrepreneurial activities, of which trade was a significant factor. Some people of African descent became owners of shops. But, the status of a free citizen brought new challenges and conditions that a man of color had to face. A freed person of color needed to have a job, was required to pay the tribute, was called to serve in the militia to defend the state. All were under supervision of the Holy Office.

The Crown raised revenues on the freed black population. A decree that compelled former slaves to hire themselves out to and reside with a Spaniard master was another way to limit freedom of emancipated blacks. While some did stay with Spanish in order to save money, the large majority successfully defied the rule and began building "joint communities" to support each other. A discrimination policy with big and long-term impact was the exclusion of blacks and mulattoes from education. Universities and schools largely run by the Church forbade the non-white population to enroll, under the justification that they were "unworthy of being educated". Wealthy, skilled, capable mulattoes however made their way through the political ladder and achieved occupation of minor official posts.

In 1821, General José de San Martín outlaws slave trade in Peru.

In 1835, President Felipe Santiago Salaverry signed a decree again legalizing the deportation of slaves through the other Latin American countries. Thus, two years after his death, will be removed from the constitution the principle of "emancipating soil" according to which a slave entering Peru is, de facto, made free.

In 1854, President Ramón Castilla y Marquezado declared slavery abolished.

Today, Afro-Peruvian communities celebrate the landmark decision of Castilla with a popular refrain:

The newly freed citizens typically took the last name of their former owners. For instance, slaves in the service of the Florez family named themselves "Florez" or "Flores".

Despite the gradual emancipation of most black slaves in Peru, slavery continued along the Pacific coast of South America throughout the 19th century, as Peruvian slave traders kidnapped Polynesians, primarily from the Marquesas Islands and Easter Island and forced them to perform physical labour in mines and in the guano industry of Peru and Chile.

Afro-Peruvian music

Afro-Peruvian music has its roots in the communities of black slaves brought to work in the mines along the Peruvian coast. As such, it's a fair way from the Andes, culturally and geographically. However, as it developed, particularly in the 20th century, it drew on Andean, Spanish, and African traditions, while its modern exponents also have affinities with Andean nueva canción. As a result, the hotbed for Afro-Peruvian music are the small coastal towns of Chincha and Cañete, not too far south of Peru's capital, Lima.
The music was little known even in Peru until the 1950s, when it was popularized by José Durand, Porfirio Vásquez, Nicomedes Santa Cruz, and Victoria Santa Cruz, whose body of work was taken a step further in the 1970s by the group Perú Negro. At an international level, this form of music has had recent publicity through David Byrne's Luaka Bop music label, with the edition of the compilation by the group Perú Negro and the albums by Susana Baca.
There are demonstrations that are still valid, such as the "Danza de Negritos y Las Pallitas" developed at Christmas time in the towns of the central coast of Peru.

Afro-Peruvians today

The Afro-Peruvian population is found mainly in two sectors: north coast (between Lambayeque and Piura); and on the south central coast (especially in Lima, Callao, and in the provinces of Cañete, Chincha, Pisco, and Nazca).

The highest concentration of Afro-Peruvians in the country is found in Yapatera in Morropón (Piura); composed of about 7000 farmers, most of whom are descendants of former African slaves, where a large number of people of "Malagasy" or "Mangache" origin (from Madagascar) stand out. The Province of Morropón is known for its black communities in cities such as the capital city of Morropón, around Chulucanas, in addition to Yapatera, there are Chapica del Carmelo, Salitral, Buenos Aires, La Mantaza, (Hacienda Pabur), San Juan de Mustache and Canchaque. Between the provinces of Ayabaca and Sullana you can also find black communities such as Las Lomas, La Tina (near the border) or Pacaipampa.

When it says "northern valleys" it refers to valleys that are in the yunga. Cities such as the famous colonial city of Zaña in Lambayeque stand out for being the second most important Afro-Peruvian city in northern Peru. Other cities such as: Tumán, Batán Grande, Cayaltí and Capote in the department of Lambayeque are known for hosting a good number of Afro-Peruvian populations.

In the city of Lima, the districts of Cercado, Breña, Surquillo, San Martín de Porres, Barranco, Surco, Chorrillos, Rímac and La Victoria are known for having regular numbers of Afro-Peruvian populations, as well as Callao. The town of Aucallama in the province of Huaral is also known.

The coastal cities of the central and southern regions known for their black populations are Cañete, Chincha, Pisco, Ica and Nazca. Formerly the communities to the south of Lima were known as the peoples with the highest intensity of Afro-Peru, but due to excessive miscegenation between African descendants and Andean migrants, the Afro-Peruvian roots have been lost. Another reason is that many of them also migrated to Lima for better opportunities. However, there are still important settlements known for their traditional presence of Afro-Peruvians: El Carmen and El Guayabo, in the province of Chincha, where Julio "Chocolate" Algendones and the traditional Ballumbrosio family come from; in addition to San Luis, in the province of Cañete, land of Caitro Soto, Coco Linares and Ronaldo Campos.

Further south there are Afro-Peruvian communities in the district of El Ingenio, in the province of Nazca; and the town of Acarí, in the province of Caravelí, in the coastal north of the department of Arequipa.

An interesting fact is that former African slaves came to small valleys of the central high jungle located in Cerro de Pasco and Huánuco. There are still small populations with distant but evidently African features.

Geographical distribution 
According to the 2017 Peruvian Census, 828,841 or 3.6% Peruvians identified as "Black", the term used for people of unmixed African descent, while together with the Mulatos and Zambos they would be a total of 9% of the Peruvian population (2,850,000).  The departments with the largest percentage of Black people are Tumbes (11.5%), Piura (8.9), and Lambayeque (8.4%). The regions with the lowest percentage of self-identified Black people are Puno (0.0), Huancavelica (0.1), and Cuzco (0.2%).

Government apology
In November 2009, the Peruvian government issued an official apology to Peru's Afro-Peruvian people for centuries of racial injustice; it was the first such apology ever made by the government. It was announced by Women's and Social Development Minister Nidia Vilchez, and initially published in the official newspaper El Peruano. The apology said:  
Vilchez said the government hoped its apology would help promote the "true integration of all Peru's multicultural population."

The government acknowledged that some discrimination persists against Afro-Peruvians, who make up 5%–10% of the population. The government's initial statement said, "The government recognizes and regrets that vestiges of racially-motivated harassment are still present, which represent a hindrance to social, economic, labor and educational development of the population at large." Monica Carrillo of the Center for Afro-Peruvian Studies and Promotion indicates that 27% of Afro-Peruvians finish high school and just 2% get higher or technical education. Although Peru is not the first Latin American government to apologize to its population, it is the first to acknowledge present-day discrimination. Although some human rights groups lauded the government's acknowledgment, other experts criticized the apology overall for failing to reference slavery or promise a change in the status quo.

The public ceremony for the apology held on 7 December 2009 in the Great Dining Room of the Government Palace, with the presence of then President Alan García, the Minister of Women and Social Development, Nidia Vilchez, the Afro Peruvian Congress member Martha Moyano, with the former mayor of El Carmen, Hermes Palma-Quiroz, and the founder of the Black Movement Francisco Congo, Paul Colino-Monroy.

In the ceremony, President García said:

Notable Afro-Peruvians

Juan Jose Cabezudo (died 1860), chef
Nicomedes Santa Cruz (1925–1992), folklorist, Afro-Peruvian writer and poet
 Andy Polo
 Carlos Ascues
Pedro Gallese, Goalkeeper for the Orlando City Soccer Club
Victoria Santa Cruz (1922–2014), folklorist and director of the Conjunto Nacional de Folclore del Instituto Nacional de Cultura
Ronaldo Campos (1927–2001), renowned musician and dancer, founder of the Peru Negro group
Eva Ayllón, pop singer, interpreter of folk music and renowned Afro-Peruvian
Christian Ramos, footballer for the Peruvian national team
Susana Baca, musician; won a Grammy Award for Best Folk Album in 2002; composer, singer and scholar of the rhythms of "Afro" descent in Peru; responsible for recovering almost forgotten harmonies and rhythms of Afro-Peruvian music
Caitro Soto, Afro-Peruvian musician and composer
Gerónimo Barbadillo, former soccer player, played Italian football in the 1980s
Micaela Bastidas Puyucahua, revolutionary and wife of Tupac Amaru II
Lucila Campos, singer and member of Perú Negro
Arturo "Zambo" Cavero, singer and percussionist
Héctor Chumpitaz Gonzales, former soccer player, former captain of Americas 1970–1980
Teófilo Cubillas, considered the greatest Peruvian soccer player of all time
Pedro Pablo León, Peru's soccer player of the 1970 FIFA World Cup
José Gil de Castro, "Mulato Gil de Castro", artist, hero of the Peruvian Revolution as well as renowned soldier in Chilean army
Jefferson Farfán, current soccer player for Lokomotiv Moscow
Francisco Fierro ("Pancho Fierro"), artist
Luisa Fuentes, better known as Lucha Fuentes, volleyball player with the Peruvian national team; won numerous international titles, including five championships and three South American Panamerican Subchampionships; participated in two Olympics (Mexico and Montreal) and six world championships
Teresa Izquierdo (1934–2011), chef and restaurant founder
Juan Joya, former soccer player of Alianza Lima Peru, Peñarol Uruguay and River Plate Argentina
Julio Meléndez, named the greatest Boca Juniors stopper
Mauro Mina, former South American light-heavyweight champion boxer
María Elena Moyano, civil leader
Martha Moyano, congresswoman
Manuel Ricardo Palma Soriano, poet, writer, author of Peruvian Traditions
St. Martin de Porres, famous Limeño saint, first black saint
Lucha Reyes, interpreter, folk singer known for her voice in Peruvian Waltz and participating in boleros in Mexico
Luis Miguel Sánchez Cerro (1889–1933), president of Peru
Rafael Santa Cruz, actor
Andres Soto, singer-songwriter
Caitro Soto, born Pedro Carlos Soto de la Colina, musician, composer, cajon player
Cecilia Tait, former volleyball player; regarded as among the best players of all time in the spike; Congresswoman-elect of the Republic during the 2001–06 legislative period
Immortal Technique, aka Felipe Andres Coronel, American rapper and urban activist.
Julio César Uribe, former soccer player, idol of Junior de Barranquilla Americas and Mexico. He also played for Italian football in the 1980s
Pablo Branda Villanueva (aka Melcochita), salsa singer and comedian
Delia Zamudio (born 1943) trade unionist and human rights activist
Zena Elías Surco, Historian, writer and poet from "El Ingenio" Valley, in Nazca, Ica. Author of "Ica de Ayer y Hoy".
 Luis Advíncula
 Luis Guadalupe
 Pedro Aquino, footballer
 Marcos López
Andre Carrillo
 Julio Landauri
 Yordy Reyna
 Paolo Hurtado
Renato Tapia
 Miguel Araujo
 Deyair Reyes
 Adan Balbin
 Jair Céspedes

See also

 Afro-Latin American
 Afro-Spaniard
 Cañete Province
List of Afro-Latinos
 Música criolla
 Música negra
 Negro

Notes and references

Further reading
Blanchard, Peter. Slavery and Abolition in early Republican Peru
Browser, Frederick P. The African Slave in Colonial Peru
Jouve Martn, Jos Ramn. The Black doctors of colonial Lima: Science, race, and writing in colonial and early republican Peru. Montréal & Kingston : McGill-Queen's University Press, [2014]
Lockhart, James. Spanish Peru: A Colonial Society
Millones, Luis. Minorias étnicas en el Perú

External links
Museo Afro Peruano
Joshua Project - Afro-Peruvian
Peruvian Music
Peru Negro
Imágen(Es) E Identidad Del Sujeto Afroperuano En La Novela Peruana Contemporánea
Pobreza, discriminacion social e indentidad: El caso de la poblacion afrodescendiente en el Peru
Black Conquistadors: Armed Africans In Early Spanish America

 
Ethnic groups in Peru
Peruvian